The Irish Law Times is a law journal for practitioners and academic lawyers that covers a range of legal topics.

Its forerunner, the Irish Law Times and Solicitors' Journal, was first established in 1865.  The journal included law reports cited as I.L.T.R.  and was still publishing under that title until its acquisition by Round Hall Press in 1983, when the title was re-launched under the name Irish Law Times.

The journal is published 20 times per year in Dublin, Ireland, by Thomson Round Hall. The current editor is David P. Boyle.

External links
 Article index for Irish Law Times since 1997 from Irish Legal Information Initiative
 The Irish law times and solicitors' journal full text of most volumes to 1879 from HathiTrust

Irish law journals
Law journals
Magazines established in 1865